Peter Terting is a German auto racing driver, born on 19 February 1984 in Kempten. He won the Volkswagen Lupo Cup in 2002, earning him a DTM drive for Abt Sportsline in 2003, although this proved to be too big a step up, and the teenager struggled to be competitive.

After winning the 2004 German SEAT León Championship, he earned a full-time drive in the World Touring Car Championship (WTCC) for SEAT, joining Rickard Rydell and Jordi Gené. He finished 12th overall, which included taking his first win in Mexico City, having finished 7th in race 1 and thus started 2nd in race 2 (the top 8 positions on the grid are reversed for the 2nd race of the meeting) . For 2006 he raced for SEAT's Team Deutschland in the WTCC, improving to finish 9th overall. In both seasons he finished 18 of the 20 races.

Terting lost his SEAT drive for the 2007 season. He instead made two starts in International GT Open and two in the Spanish GT Championship in a Sunred Engineering Sunred SR21. He returned to SEAT in WTCC for the final two races of the season. In 2008 Terting again did not have a full-time drive. He made two starts in ADAC GT Masters driving a Kessel Racing Ferrari 430 and drove in the 24 Hours Nürburgring in a R-Line Volkswagen GTI, finishing 10th in class. He also drove a VW in the race in 2010.

He was engaged to British racing driver Katherine Legge before entering a relationship with German driver Carrie Schreiner, some 14 years his junior.

Racing record

Complete Deutsche Tourenwagen Masters results
(key)

1 -  A non-championship one-off race was held in 2004 at the streets of Shanghai, China.

Complete World Touring Car Championship results
(key) (Races in bold indicate pole position) (Races in italics indicate fastest lap)

Complete TCR Europe Series results
(key) (Races in bold indicate pole position) (Races in italics indicate fastest lap)

† Driver did not finish, but was classified as he completed over 75% of the race distance.

References

1984 births
German racing drivers
World Touring Car Championship drivers
Deutsche Tourenwagen Masters drivers
Living people
People from Kempten im Allgäu
Sportspeople from Swabia (Bavaria)
Racing drivers from Bavaria
ADAC GT Masters drivers
International GT Open drivers
24H Series drivers
Abt Sportsline drivers
Nürburgring 24 Hours drivers
Phoenix Racing drivers
Saintéloc Racing drivers
Cupra Racing drivers
GT4 European Series drivers
Toksport WRT drivers
TCR Europe Touring Car Series drivers
Hyundai Motorsport drivers
Volkswagen Motorsport drivers